Stadsfries or Town Frisian is a set of dialects spoken in certain cities in the province of Friesland in the northern Netherlands, namely Leeuwarden, Sneek, Bolsward, Franeker, Dokkum, Harlingen, Stavoren, and to some extent in Heerenveen.  For linguistic reasons, the outlying and insular dialects of Midsland (Terschelling), Ameland, Het Bildt, and Kollum are also sometimes tied to Stadsfries.

The vocabulary of Stadsfries is derived primarily from Dutch.  The dialects began in the late 15th century, when Frisia lost its political independence to the Netherlands.  For many living in Frisia, learning Dutch became a necessity.  The result was a mixture of Hollandic dialect vocabulary and West Frisian grammar and other language principles. Since this process began, the West Frisian language itself has evolved, such that Stadsfries is further away from modern Frisian than it is from Old Frisian. Norval Smith states that Stadsfries is a Frisian–Dutch mixed language.

The name of the dialect group, Stadsfries, is not an endonym but is instead a Dutch term for the language.  Stad (German: Stadt) is a Germanic term for "city" or "town", seen in English place names such as "Hempstead".  In Stadsfries, the term for the dialect group is Stadsfrys or Stads, or each dialect is known simply by a name derived from the particular city name, such as Liwwarders for the dialect of Leeuwarden.  In West Frisian, the dialects are known as stedsk ("city-ish"), which does not indicate the idea that Stadsfries is a form of Frisian.

Vocabulary 

The vocabulary of Stadsfries is mainly Dutch though the West Frisian language influence is notable. Furthermore, a set of word forms are used that are clearly West Frisian, not Dutch.
Examples:

The language also has typical West Frisian words that don't exist (in that sense) in Dutch, usually this concerns domestic words and words from the mainly West Frisian language agricultural sector.
Examples:

Other differences between Dutch and West Frisian can be traced back to the Dutch dialect of the 16th century.
Example:

Finally, several words have survived in the Stadsfries language due to Dutch influence that have since disappeared from the West Frisian language.
Examples:

Grammar 

Stadsfries has these properties in common with West Frisian, as well as several Dutch dialects.

The plurals match West Frisian (skip-skippen), as do the diminutives (popke, autootsje, rinkje), except those in Stavers (poppy, autootsy, rinkje), where Hollands rules are followed.

The verbs are missing two West Frisian weak classes, but do use West Frisian rules for forming past participles: they never get the affix ge- (ik hew maakt; hest dou dat sien?).  Stadsfrisian kept the West  Frisian pronouns do, jo and jimme (informal you, formal you, plural you), although do and jo are almost always written as dou and jou.  These words can in fact be used as criteria for deciding whether a Hollandic-West Frisian mixed dialect can still be considered Stadsfries.  The Dutch dialect called "West Frisian" spoken in the West Friesland region of North Holland for example does not have these words and is therefore considered Hollandic.

Spelling 

There is no standardized, officially recognized spelling for Stadsfries.  The very few authors that write in it each use their own spelling conventions.  The most commonly used spelling is that in the Woordenboek fan ut Liwwarders (Leeuwarden Dictionary).  This spelling convention is closely related to, but more phonetic than West Frisian, and does not use the letter û.

Speakers

The use of Stadsfries is declining rapidly, especially in Leeuwarden.  No more than a quarter of the city's population (approximately 20,000 people) speaks the language, although that percentage is higher in smaller towns.  In the first half of the twentieth century the town of Heerenveen had a local strand of Stadsfries known as Haagjes Fries, spoken especially around Oranjewoud, near the country home of the Frisian stadhouder.

Use of most dialects (as well as the West Frisian language) is declining, but because West Frisian is considered prestigious and even recognized as a Dutch national language, Stadsfries has become a sociolect of the lower classes, especially in the cities.   The transition from dialect to sociolect happened primarily in the 20th century.  Around 1900, the Stadsfries dialects were still considered regional strands of Dutch and given a much higher status than Frisian.  With the rise of Standard Dutch in society's upper classes, brought on particularly by education and mass media, Stadsfries stopped being considered a strand of Dutch.  Since the lower classes had less exposure to Standard Dutch, they remained as some of the only speakers of Stadsfries.

References

External links
 http://lowlands-l.net/anniversary/stadsfrys-info.php
 http://www.lowlands-l.net/talk/nld/index.php?page=stadsfries

West Germanic languages
Languages of the Netherlands
Mixed languages